Indira Canteen is a food subsidisation programme run by the Ministry of Food, Civil Supplies and Consumer affairs, Government of Karnataka in Inspired from the Amma Unavagam of Tamilnadu. It is named after Indira Gandhi, the first and only female Prime Minister of India.

Structure 
The canteens serving food in civic wards of districts and taluka places of Karnataka. The canteen serves breakfast, lunch, and dinners. Aimed at aiding economically disadvantaged sections of society at a subsidized price.

Food items 
Idlis and coconut chutney along with variety rice of the day will be served in breakfast, for lunch and dinner, rice, sambar, curd rice, tomato bath, and a few other items will be served.

References 

 Restaurants in Bangalore
 Culture of Bangalore
2017 establishments in Karnataka
Government schemes in Karnataka